Antonio Jason LaBarbera (born January 18, 1980) is a Canadian former professional ice hockey goaltender who played parts of 11 seasons in the National Hockey League (NHL).

He was originally drafted by the New York Rangers in the 1998 NHL Entry Draft during his major junior career in the Western Hockey League (WHL), and has also additionally played for the Los Angeles Kings, Vancouver Canucks, Phoenix Coyotes, Edmonton Oilers, Chicago Blackhawks, and Anaheim Ducks during his NHL career.

Playing career

Amateur
As a youth, LaBarbera played in the 1993 Quebec International Pee-Wee Hockey Tournament with a minor ice hockey team from Langley, British Columbia.

LaBarbera played major junior ice hockey in the Western Hockey League (WHL) primarily with the Portland Winter Hawks for four seasons and briefly with the Tri-City Americans and Spokane Chiefs. He was drafted by the New York Rangers in the 1998 NHL Entry Draft in the third round, 66th overall.

Professional

New York Rangers (2000–2005)
LaBarbera saw his first NHL action with the New York Rangers in his first season out of junior in relief of Kirk McLean, his childhood hero, on October 14, 2000. He recorded two saves in ten minutes of play in an 8–6 loss to the Pittsburgh Penguins. He spent his first four seasons with the Rangers' organization, however, in the minor leagues with the Charlotte Checkers of the ECHL and the Hartford Wolf Pack of the American Hockey League (AHL).

The 2003–04 season brought an increase in playing time for LaBarbera with the Rangers. In the midst of a spectacular season with the Wolf Pack, which culminated in a Les Cunningham Award as AHL MVP and an Aldege "Baz" Bastien Memorial Award as top goaltender, he was called up to the Rangers and played in four games that season. LaBarbera recorded a 1–2–0 record, 4.85 goals against average (GAA) and a .824 save percentage during his brief stint. His lone NHL victory that season, the first of his career, was a 3–2 win over the Washington Capitals on March 5, 2004.

Continuing to play with the Wolf Pack during the 2004–05 NHL lockout, LaBarbera earned the Harry "Hap" Holmes Memorial Award for allowing the fewest goals in the League.

Los Angeles Kings (2005–2008)
Despite another successful season in the AHL, the Rangers did not re-sign LaBarbera, presumably due to the Rangers' deep depth in goal, with standout draft picks Henrik Lundqvist and Al Montoya in the team's pipeline. Instead, he signed as a free agent with the Los Angeles Kings in the off-season.

LaBarbera's first full season in the NHL was spent backing-up Kings starting goaltender Mathieu Garon. He got off to a quick start with the Kings, going undefeated in his first seven starts. LaBarbera earned his first career NHL shutout on April 17, 2006, blanking the San Jose Sharks in a 4–0 victory.

In 2006–07, LaBarbera played for the Kings' minor league affiliate, the Manchester Monarchs, in the AHL. Despite injuries to Kings goaltenders Mathieu Garon and Dan Cloutier during the season, the Kings were hesitant to recall LaBarbera because he was waiver eligible, which required him to clear waivers in order to be recalled and demoted, making it likely that he would be claimed by another team. LaBarbara completed the season with the Monarchs and earned the second Harry Holmes Memorial Award and Aldege Bastien Memorial Award of his AHL career. In the off-season, LaBarbera re-signed with the Kings to a two-year contract on July 3, 2007. LaBarbera earned more playing time in 2007–08, appearing in a career-high 45 games with a 3.00 GAA and a .910 save percentage.

Vancouver Canucks (2008–2009)
The following season, on December 30, 2008, LaBarbera was traded to his hometown team, the Vancouver Canucks, in exchange for a seventh-round draft pick in 2009, a trade resulting in the emergence of rookie goaltender Jonathan Quick. The Canucks dealt for LaBarbera in light of injuries to Roberto Luongo and backup Curtis Sanford. LaBarbara earned his first win with the Canucks in his club debut, making 31 saves in a 2–1 victory over the Nashville Predators on January 1, 2009.

Phoenix Coyotes (2009–2013)
LaBarbera was signed to a two-year, $2 million contract by the Phoenix Coyotes to back-up Coyotes starter Ilya Bryzgalov on July 1, 2009. LaBarbara compiled a total record of 15–11–4 in his first two seasons in Phoenix. On June 6, 2011, he was re-signed by the Coyotes to another two-year contract.

Edmonton Oilers (2013)
On July 5, 2013, during the free agency period of 2013, LaBarbera signed a one-year, $1 million deal with the Edmonton Oilers. He competed with Richard Bachman to be the backup to starter Devan Dubnyk. After Bachman was injured, then sent down to Edmonton's AHL affiliate, LaBarbera won the backup job in Edmonton.

Chicago Blackhawks (2013–2014)
On December 14, 2013, LaBarbera was traded to the Chicago Blackhawks in exchange for future considerations. LaBarbera never appeared in a game for the Blackhawks. Instead, he went (15-15-2) with the Rockford Icehogs, the team's AHL affiliate.

Anaheim Ducks (2014–2015)
On July 1, 2014, the Anaheim Ducks signed LaBarbera as a free agent to a one-year, $750,000 contract.  He attended the Ducks' training camp before ultimately being assigned to their AHL affiliate, the Norfolk Admirals, after clearing waivers.

Philadelphia Flyers (2015–2016)
On July 2, 2015, LaBarbera signed a one-year, two-way contract with the Philadelphia Flyers. He never appeared for the Flyers, but rather spent the entire season in the AHL with the Lehigh Valley Phantoms.

On July 19, 2016, LaBarbera announced his retirement from professional hockey after 16 seasons.

Coaching career 
After retiring as a player Labarbera accepted a role as the goaltending coach of the Calgary Hitmen of the Western Hockey League. On December 16, 2020, LaBarbera was named the new goaltending coach for the Calgary Flames.

Personal life
LaBarbera and his wife Kodette are the parents of two sons, Ryder and Easton. Ryder was diagnosed with autism. Kodette starred in the Canadian W Network TV show Hockey Wives and talked about her son's autism treatment program in Calgary, Alberta.

Career statistics

Awards
 Named to the WHL All-Star Team in 2000.
 Named to the AHL First All-Star Team in 2004 and 2007.
 Awarded the Aldege "Baz" Bastien Memorial Award (AHL Top Goaltender) in 2004 and 2007.
 Awarded the Les Cunningham Award (AHL MVP) in 2004.
 Awarded the Harry "Hap" Holmes Memorial Award (AHL, fewest team goals against) in 2005 and 2007.

Records 
 Most shutouts in one season in the AHL – 13 (2003–04)

References

External links
 

1980 births
Anaheim Ducks players
Canadian ice hockey goaltenders
Charlotte Checkers (1993–2010) players
Edmonton Oilers players
Hartford Wolf Pack players
Ice hockey people from British Columbia
Lehigh Valley Phantoms players
Living people
Los Angeles Kings players
Manchester Monarchs (AHL) players
New York Rangers draft picks
New York Rangers players
Norfolk Admirals players
Oklahoma City Barons players
Phoenix Coyotes players
Portland Winterhawks players
Rockford IceHogs (AHL) players
Spokane Chiefs players
Sportspeople from Burnaby
Tri-City Americans players
Vancouver Canucks players